David Forrest Thompson (March 3, 1918 – February 26, 1979) was a pitcher in Major League Baseball who played from  through  for the Washington Senators. He was born in Mooresville, North Carolina.
 
A hard thrower, Thompson was a bad luck pitcher either due to injury or to playing on such a hapless team as the Senators. In a two-season career, he posted a 7–13 record with a decent 3.90 ERA in 55 appearances, including eight starts, one complete game and four saves, giving up 82 runs (18 unearned) on 156 hits and 63 walks while striking out 48 in 147⅔ innings of work. He also helped himself with the bat, hitting for a .325 average (13-for-40) with four RBI and a .450 slugging percentage.

Thompson died in Charlotte, North Carolina, at the age of 60.

Highlights
In 1948, Thompson ranked fourth in the American League both in games pitched (46) and games finished (24).

External links
Baseball Almanac
Baseball Reference
Retrosheet

1918 births
1979 deaths
Atlanta Crackers players
Baseball players from North Carolina
Cedar Rapids Raiders players
Flint Gems players
Leaksville-Draper-Spray Triplets players
Major League Baseball pitchers
Newton-Conover Twins players
Oakland Oaks (baseball) players
People from Mooresville, North Carolina
Tyler Trojans players
Washington Senators (1901–1960) players
Mooresville Moors players